HR 3384 (11 G. Pyxidis) is solitary star in the southern constellation of Pyxis. It has an apparent magnitude of 6.38, indicating it is faintly visible to the naked eye. Based on the Bortle scale, the star can be viewed from dark rural skies. It is moving away from the Sun with a radial velocity of +81.91.

This star is lower in mass than the Sun at around 75%, and has just 85% of the Sun's radius. The spectrum matches a spectral class G9V, indicating that this is a G-type main sequence star that is generating energy through the nuclear fusion of hydrogen at its core. The star is radiating 44% of the Sun's luminosity from its photosphere at an effective temperature of 5,290 K. It is about six billion years old and is rotating slowly with a period of around 40 days. Surface magnetic activity has been detected with a periodic cycle of  days. HR 3384 has been examined for evidence of a circumstellar debris disk or planets, but, as of 2012, none have been discovered.

References

External links
 http://www.stellar-database.com/Scripts/search_star.exe?Name=HR+3384

G-type main-sequence stars
HR, 3384
Pyxis (constellation)
CD-31 6229
0309
Pyxidis, 11
072673
041926
3384